The 1970 Rhode Island Rams football team was an American football team that represented the University of Rhode Island as a member of the Yankee Conference during the 1970 NCAA College Division football season. In its first season under head coach Jack Gregory, the team compiled a 3–5 record (3–2 against conference opponents), tied for third place out of six teams in the Yankee Conference, and was  outscored by a total of 178 to 125. The team played its home games at Meade Stadium in Kingston, Rhode Island.

Schedule

References

Rhode Island
Rhode Island Rams football seasons
Rhode Island Rams football